Thornhope is an unincorporated community in Van Buren Township, Pulaski County, in the U.S. state of Indiana.

History
Thornhope was originally known as Parisville, and under the latter name was laid out in 1853 when the railroad was extended to that point.

Another variant name of the community was called Oak. A post office ran with this name from 1856 to 1966.

Geography

References

External links

Unincorporated communities in Pulaski County, Indiana
Unincorporated communities in Indiana
1853 establishments in Indiana
Populated places established in 1853